Ghulam Ahmad Mir is an Indian politician from Indian National Congress who had represented Dooru (Vidhan Sabha constituency) in the Jammu and Kashmir State Assembly. He was the President of Jammu & Kashmir Pradesh Congress Committee. In the 2019 Lok Sabha Elections, he lost to Hasan Masoodi of National Conference.

In July 2022, he resigned from Indian National Congress from his position at the J&K Congres.

References

Living people
Indian National Congress politicians from Jammu and Kashmir
Year of birth missing (living people)